Bart De Pauw (28 May 1968) is a Flemish TV host, comedian, actor and TV and film scriptwriter, known for humorous television series and shows on Belgian public television, like Buiten De Zone, Schalkse Ruiters, Het Geslacht De Pauw (a parody of reality TV), Willy's en Marjetten, De Mol, Quiz Me Quick and De Biker Boys. He is also the scriptwriter of the Belgian blockbuster film Loft (2008), the original Flemish version of the Hollywood remake The Loft (2014).

Allegations of sexual intimidation 
Inspired by the Me Too movement, several women who worked with De Pauw on past productions filed complaints of sexual intimidation against him with Flemish public radio and television broadcasting service's ombudsman. Consequently, VRT decided to stop all collaboration with De Pauw and his production house as of 9 November 2017. After a widely mediatized trial in 2021, De Pauw was fount guilty of stalking (5 women) and 'digital harassment' (1 woman). The court handed down a six-month suspended sentence.

References

1968 births
Living people
Flemish male film actors
Flemish male television actors
Belgian male comedians
People from Wachtebeke
Belgian parodists
Belgian screenwriters
Belgian television presenters
Flemish television presenters
Belgian television producers
Flemish television writers
Male television writers
Sex scandals
Scandals in Belgium
Controversies in Belgium
Film controversies in Belgium
People convicted of stalking